Scomberesox simulans, the dwarf saury, is a species of ray-finned fish within the family Scomberesocidae, found in the Atlantic and Indian Ocean. It inhabits tropical and subtropical waters near the surface as a pelagic-oceanic species, migrating as the ocean warms in the spring and summer. It mainly feeds on planktonic organisms. The maximum length recorded was 13 centimeters in length, although the species is most commonly found at 9-10 centimeters in length. It is often confused as the juvenile form of the Atlantic saury.

Conservation 
Scomberesox simulans is classified as a 'least concern' species by the IUCN Red List, as its quite common within its range, has no known major threats, and is to small to be of interest to commercial fisheries. No conservation measures have been made towards the species.

References 

Fish described in 1980
IUCN Red List least concern species
Fish of the Atlantic Ocean
Fish of the Indian Ocean
simulans